Lebyazhye is a rural locality (a selo) in Pavlovskoye Rural Settlement, Ramonsky District, Voronezh Oblast, Russia. The population was 207 as of 2010. There are 4 streets.

Geography 
Lebyazhye is located on the Bolshaya Vereyka River, 45 km northwest of Ramon (the district's administrative centre) by road. Gremyachye is the nearest rural locality.

References 

Rural localities in Ramonsky District